Betta pulchra is a species of gourami endemid that is found in Johor, Malaysia.  It is an inhabitant of the acidic black waters of peat swamps where it is found amongst vegetation.  This species grows to a length of  SL.

References

pulchra
Taxa named by Heok Hui Tan
Fish described in 1996